José da Costa may refer to:

 José da Costa (volleyball) (born 1941), Brazilian volleyball player
 José da Costa (footballer) (born 1928), Portuguese footballer